Christie Carpino is a member of the Connecticut House of Representatives.

She graduated from the University of New Hampshire and Northeastern University. She is married with two children and one stepchild.

Career
Carpino was first elected to the House of Representatives in 2010. She is a Republican.

References

Republican Party members of the Connecticut House of Representatives
Women state legislators in Connecticut
University of New Hampshire alumni
Northeastern University alumni
21st-century American politicians
21st-century American women politicians
Living people
Year of birth missing (living people)